Drug overdose and intoxication are significant causes of accidental death, and can also be used as a form of suicide. Death can occur from overdosing on a single or multiple drugs, or from combined drug intoxication (CDI) due to poly drug use. Poly drug use often carries more risk than use of a single drug, due to an increase in side effects, and drug synergy. For example, the chance of death from overdosing on opiates is greatly increased when they are consumed in conjunction with alcohol. While they are two distinct phenomena, deaths from CDI are often misreported as overdoses. Drug overdoses and intoxication can also cause indirect deaths. For example, while marijuana does not cause fatal overdoses, being intoxicated by it can increase the chance of fatal traffic collisions.

Drug use and overdoses increased significantly in the 1800s due to the commercialization and availability of certain drugs. For example, while opium and coca had been used for centuries, their active ingredients, morphine and the cocaine alkaloid, were not isolated until 1803 and 1855 respectively. Cocaine and various opiates were subsequently mass-produced and sold openly and legally in the Western world, resulting in widespread misuse and addiction. Drug use and addiction also increased significantly following the invention of the hypodermic syringe in 1853, with overdose being a leading cause of death among intravenous drug users.

Efforts to prohibit various drugs began to be enacted in the early 20th century, though the effectiveness of such policies is debated. Deaths from drug overdoses are increasing. Between 2000 and 2014, fatal overdoses rose 137% in the United States, causing nearly half a million deaths in that period, and have also been continually increasing in Australia, Scotland, England, and Wales. 
While prohibited drugs are generally viewed as being the most dangerous, the misuse of prescription drugs is linked to more deaths in several countries. Cocaine and heroin combined caused fewer deaths than prescriptions drugs in the United Kingdom in 2013, and fewer deaths than prescription opiates alone in the United States in 2008. , the drug most likely to cause fatal overdose in Australia was diazepam (Valium). While fatal overdoses are highly associated with drugs such as opiates, cocaine and alcohol, deaths from other drugs such as caffeine are extremely rare.

This alphabetical list contains 621 notable people whose deaths can be reliably sourced to be the result of drug overdose or acute drug intoxication. Where sources indicate drug overdose or intoxication was only suspected to be the cause of death, this will be specified in the 'notes' column. Where sources are able to indicate, deaths are specified as 'suicide', 'accidental', 'undetermined', or otherwise in the 'cause' column. Where sources do not explicitly state intent, they will be listed in this column as 'unknown'. Deaths from accidents or misadventure caused by drug overdoses or intoxication are also included on this list. Deaths from long-term effects of drugs, such as tobacco-related cancers and cirrhosis from alcohol, are not included, nor are deaths from lethal injection or legal euthanasia.

Deaths

See also
 List of deaths through alcohol
 Lists of people by cause of death
 List of deaths from legal euthanasia and assisted suicide
 List of people executed by lethal injection
 Opioid epidemic
 United States drug overdose death rates and totals over time

References

Citations

Bibliography 

list
Drug-related lists
Drug overdose
Lists of people by cause of death